Dragon Seed is a 1944 American war drama film, about Japan's WWII-era actions in China.The movie directed by Jack Conway and Harold S. Bucquet, based on the 1942 novel of the same name by Pearl S. Buck. The film stars Katharine Hepburn, Walter Huston, Aline MacMahon, Akim Tamiroff, and Turhan Bey. It portrays a peaceful village in China that has been invaded by the Imperial Japanese Army during the Second Sino-Japanese War. The men in the village choose to adopt a peaceful attitude toward their conquerors, but the headstrong Jade (Hepburn) stands up to the Japanese.

Aline MacMahon was nominated for an Academy Award for Best Supporting Actress.

Plot
A peaceful Chinese village is invaded by the Japanese prior to World War II. The men elect to adopt a peaceful attitude towards their conquerors, and the women are understood to stoically acquiesce as well, but Jade, a headstrong young woman, intends to stand up to the Japanese, whether her husband Lao Er approves or not. She even goes so far as to learn to read and to handle a weapon, so that she may be properly equipped for both psychological and physical combat. Jade's attitude spreads to the rest of the village, convincing even the staunchest of male traditionalists that the Japanese can be defeated only by offering a strong united front, male and female.

Cast

Production
Reportedly, Judy Garland wanted the role of Jade.

Box office
According to MGM records, the film earned $3,033,000 in the U.S. and Canada and $1,594,000 elsewhere, but because of its high cost, incurred a loss to the studio of $281,000.

See also
 Examples of yellowface
 Whitewashing in film
 List of American films of 1944

References

External links

 
 
 
 

1944 films
1944 drama films
1940s war drama films
American black-and-white films
American war drama films
Films based on American novels
Films based on works by Pearl S. Buck
Films directed by Harold S. Bucquet
Films directed by Jack Conway
Films scored by Herbert Stothart
Films set in China
Films with screenplays by Jane Murfin
Metro-Goldwyn-Mayer films
Second Sino-Japanese War films
World War II films made in wartime
1940s English-language films